Zhiyuanduo (治元多) was a Chinese tribal leader during the late Eastern Han dynasty to the early Three Kingdoms period. She was from the Hu group, a  nomadic confederacy in northern China. She started a rebellion and led thousands of people against the Emperor Wen of Wei of the state of Cao Wei.

Background 
There are few records of Zhiyuanduo's life. His real name is not known nor his date of birth. She was from the end of the Han dynasty period (189-220) and the beginning of the Three Kingdoms period (220–280 AD) when China was divided into the states of Cao Wei in northern China, Eastern Wu in eastern China, and Shu Han in southwestern China. She was a member of one of the non-Han Chinese tribes of Liang Province in ancient northwest China (present-day Gansu Province). Liang Province was under the authority of the kingdom of Cao Wei. In December 220, Cao Pi (Emperor Wen of Wei), who ruled as King of Wei, forced Emperor Xian, the last Han emperor, to abdicate in favor of him, after which he crowned himself Emperor Wen of Wei.

The rebellion 
In 221, Zhiyuanduo led a tribal rebellion against the central authority of the Cao Wei kingdom. The Biography of Zhang Ji (Zhāng Jì Zhuàn 张既传) within the Book of Wei (Wèishū 魏書) of the historical text Records of the Three Kingdoms (Sānguózhì 三國志) recorded: "Yi Jian's prostitute and concubine Zhiyuanduo and other people of the Lushui Hu, in the three counties of Lixian (骊蚠), Fanhe (番和), and Xianmei (显美), caused great disturbance in Hexi (Corridor) (河西走廊)."

In late 221, when Zhiyuanduo started a rebellion in Liang Province (covering parts of present-day Shaanxi and Gansu), Fei Yao joined Zou Qi, Zhang Ji, Xiahou Ru and others in suppressing the rebellion.

References

Sources 

 Chen, Shou (3rd century). Records of the Three Kingdoms (Sanguozhi).
 

3rd-century Chinese women
3rd-century Chinese people
Women in ancient Chinese warfare
Women in 3rd-century warfare
Women in war in China